The Flame of Youth is a 1917 American silent adventure film directed by Elmer Clifton and starring Jack Mulhall, Ann Forrest and Hayward Mack.

Cast
 Jack Mulhall as Jimmy Gordon
 Ann Forrest as Lucy Andrews 
 Donna Drew as Nadine 
 Hayward Mack as Sir Beverly Wyndham
 Alfred Allen as Jasper Sneedham
 Ed Brady as McCool
 Fred Montague as James Gordon Sr.
 Burton Law as Beppo
 Percy Challenger as Fred Haimer
 Harry Mann as Bennie Zussbaum
 Harry Morris as Juan

References

Bibliography
 Hans J. Wollstein. Strangers in Hollywood: the history of Scandinavian actors in American films from 1910 to World War II. Scarecrow Press, 1994.

External links
 

1917 films
1917 adventure films
1910s English-language films
American silent feature films
American adventure films
American black-and-white films
Universal Pictures films
Films directed by Elmer Clifton
1910s American films
Silent adventure films